Turner's Outdoorsman operates 34 hunting, shooting, and fishing specialty stores in California and Arizona and is one of the largest such retailers in the United States. The company, based in Ontario, California, began in 1971 as a single store in Long Beach, California and the latest, which opened in 2023 in Yuba City. The company has now expanded to Arizona.

History 

Turner's started in 1971 as Andrews’ Sporting Goods and grew to become the largest seller of handguns in California under the leadership of Shirley Andrews, who started the company with her then-husband, Bill. When they divorced in 1981, their five stores were sold to Jesse Turner. But Shirley Andrews took back the business in 1983.

Andrews sold the company in 2005 to an investment group from outside the industry. The company was sold again in 2009 to a group led by U.S. trap shooting champion Gene Lumsden, formerly vice president and operations manager of Turner's when it was still owned by Andrews.

Joining Lumsden in the purchase were John and David Fuller from Australia and the Sporting Goods Fund, a sporting goods group out of the United Kingdom. Lumsden became president and chief executive officer of the firearms chain.

Turner's works closely with non profit organizations including Safari Club International, Ducks Unlimited, California Waterfowl Association and United Anglers to help preserve and protect hunting, shooting and fishing activities in California. As of late, some stores have been involved in NRA dinners.

References

External links
 Turner's Outdoorsman

Companies based in San Bernardino County, California
Sporting goods retailers of the United States
Online retailers of the United States
Retail companies established in 1971
Retail companies based in California
Firearm commerce
Recreational fishing in the United States